Sabarubicin (MEN-10755), a disaccharide analog of doxorubicin, is used for the treatment of small cell lung cancer (SCLC). It has been seen to show superior antitumour efficacy, which is purported to be linked to the activation of p53-independent apoptosis

References

Anthracyclines